United Ghettos of America Vol. 2 is a soundtrack to accompany the DVD documentary by the same name released by Yukmouth in 2004. The soundtrack appeared on Billboard's "Top R&B/Hip-Hop Albums" chart at number 44 in 2004.

Track listing

References

2004 compilation albums
Yukmouth albums
2004 soundtrack albums
Documentary film soundtracks
Albums produced by Mike Dean (record producer)
Gangsta rap soundtracks
Sequel albums